Megasurcula tremperiana is a species of sea snail, a marine gastropod mollusk in the family Pseudomelatomidae, the turrids and allies.

Taxonomy
There is some confusion about the accepted name for this species. The website Gastropods.com considers this species a synonym of Mangelia carpenteri (Folin, L. de, 1867) It was also considered a synonym of Bathytoma tremperiana (Dall, 1911), itself considered by W.H. Dall a synonym of Cryptoconus tremperianus Dall, 1911. But then WoRMS considers this last name a synonym of Megasurcula carpenteriana (Gabb, 1865)

Description
The length of the shell attains 60 mm.

Distribution
This marine species occurs off California.

References

 W.H. Dall (1911), Notes on California shells (II). The Nautilus, vol. 24, no. 10, pp. 109–112,

External links
 
 Gastropods.com: Mangelia carpenteri
 .The marine mollusks and brachiopods of Monterey Bay,California, and vicinity; Proceedings of the California Academy of Sciences, 4th series v.26 (1948-1950)

tremperiana
Taxa named by William Healey Dall
Gastropods described in 1911